Vishwas Satarkar is an Indian politician and member of the Bharatiya Janata Party. He was a two term member of the Goa Legislative Assembly.

Posts
Vishwas Satarkar was elected Speaker of the Goa Legislative Assembly from 2002-2005.

Constituency
He represented the Priol constituency of Goa.

Goa Legislative Assembly
 Term 1999-2002 and 2002-2007.

References 

Bharatiya Janata Party politicians from Goa
Members of the Goa Legislative Assembly
Living people
Speakers of the Goa Legislative Assembly
Year of birth missing (living people)